Ellis Field, formerly known as Aggie Soccer Stadium is a soccer-specific stadium located in College Station, Texas, United States on the campus of Texas A&M University.  It has been home to the Texas A&M (women's) soccer team since 1994.

The stadium hosted the 2005, 2007, and 2009 NCAA Women's College Cup.

The stadium hosted the Houston Dynamo home matches in the 2007 CONCACAF Champions' Cup and 2011 U.S. Open Cup qualification.

A drainage system was installed prior to the 2002 campaign, and is capable of handling three inches of rain per hour. 

The stadium completed a $1 million renovation in 2011 that includes seats added to the West stands of the stadium and "party decks" on the top of the East stands. Other additions include new restroom facilities on the West side and permanent stands added to the South side. In the future, a complete roof structure will be added to the stadium.

Attendance Records
 (*) Annual Fish Camp game
 (^) Corps of Cadets game

Yearly Average Attendance

References

External links

 Ellis Field at Texas A&M Athletics Official Website
 Information at Airfield Systems

Soccer venues in Texas
Texas A&M Aggies women's soccer
College soccer venues in the United States
Sports venues in College Station, Texas
Sports venues completed in 1994
1994 establishments in Texas